Edwin Beswick Shultz (November 24, 1893 – February 1986) was a college football player and coach.

Early years
Shultz was born on November 24, 1893, in Logansport, Indiana to Dr. John Beswick Shultz and Anna L. Cooper.  He attended Logansport High School.

Washington and Lee
He was president of the student body.

Football
Shultz was a prominent All-American  tackle for the Washington and Lee Generals of Washington and Lee University from 1912 to 1915.  He was renowned for his size at the time, somewhere between 6 feet 2 inches and 6 feet 4 inches.

1912
Shultz was the only freshman to make the varsity this season. Shultz and captain Buck Miles were the tackles, a duo which "scintillated."

1914
Shultz was a member of the undefeated SAIAA champion 1914 team, which secured a share of the title when it finished the season with a victory over North Carolina A & M. The team included College Football Hall of Fame inductee Harry "Cy" Young.

An account of the 10 to 0 victory over Swarthmore that year reads "Left tackle Ted Shultz starred for the victors making long gains on forward passes and effecting tackles that checked Swarthmore."

1915
He was captain of W&L's 1915 team. During World War I, he played for Camp Jackson.

Basketball
Shultz also played on the basketball team.

Denver
Shultz was once a secretary for the YMCA in Denver, Colorado, and coached the freshman team of the University of Denver.

References

1893 births
Year of death missing
American football tackles
Centers (basketball)
Denver Pioneers football coaches
Washington and Lee Generals football coaches
Washington and Lee Generals football players
Washington and Lee Generals men's basketball players
All-American college football players
All-Southern college football players
People from Logansport, Indiana
Players of American football from Indiana
American men's basketball players